Lu Hao (born April 1947) is a Chinese politician. He served as the Communist Party Secretary of Gansu province from 2007 to 2011.

Biography
Lu was born in Changli County, Hebei. He held the post of Governor of Gansu from 2001 to 2007. He was first appointed to be the Communist Party Secretary of Gansu in April 2007. He retired from active politics in December 2011, aged 64, and since then has sat on the Standing Committee of the National People's Congress.

References

1947 births
Living people
Governors of Gansu
Politicians from Qinhuangdao
People's Republic of China politicians from Hebei
Chinese Communist Party politicians from Hebei
Lanzhou University alumni